College Apartments, also known as the Park Central Apartments, is a historic apartment building located at Springfield, Greene County, Missouri. It was originally constructed in 1910 as an expansion to Springfield Business College, and expanded and converted to apartments in 1928.  It is a three-story, Commercial Block brick building with Classical details. The building features a flat parapet capped with flat limestone block and three brick pilasters with limestone capitals and plinths.

It was listed on the National Register of Historic Places in 2003.

References

Residential buildings on the National Register of Historic Places in Missouri
Residential buildings completed in 1928
Buildings and structures in Springfield, Missouri
National Register of Historic Places in Greene County, Missouri